Statistics of Emperor's Cup in the 1963 season. The cup was held between January 12 and January 15, 1964.

Overview
It was contested by 7 teams, and Waseda University won the championship.

Results

Quarterfinals
Sumitomo Rubber 2–1 Chuo University
Hitachi 1–1 (lottery) Yawata Steel
Waseda University 2–1 Toyo Industries

Semifinals
Sumitomo Rubber 0–4 Hitachi
Waseda University 2–1 Kansai University

Final

Hitachi 0–3 Waseda University
Waseda University won the championship.

References
 NHK

Emperor's Cup
1964 in Japanese football